The Rodin tool is a tool for formal modelling in Event-B. Event-B is a notation and method developed from the B-Method and is intended to be used with an incremental style of modelling. The idea of incremental modelling has been taken from programming: modern programming languages come with integrated development environment that make it easy to modify and improve programs. The Rodin tool provides such an environment for Event-B.
The two main characteristics of the Rodin tool are its ease of use and its extensibility.
The tool focuses on modelling. It is easy to modify models and try out variations of a model. The tool can also be extended easily. This makes it possible to adapt the tool to specific needs, so the tool can be adapted to fit into existing development processes instead of demanding the opposite. The Event-B wiki is a useful user and developer resource.

Rodin (Rigorous Open Development Environment for Complex Systems) is an extension of Eclipse IDE (Java based).
Rodin Eclipse Builder coordinates:
Well-formedness + type checker
Proof obligation generator
Proof manager
Propagation of changes

Rodin Proof Manager (PM)
PM constructs proof tree for each PO
Automatic and interactive modes
PM manages used hypotheses
PM calls reasoners to
discharge goal, or
 split goal into subgoals
Collection of reasoners:
simplifier, rule‐based, decision procedures, …
Basic tactics language to define PM and reasoners

Industrial applications and case studies 
The Rodin project included five industrial case studies  that served to validate the tool set and helped with the elaboration of an appropriate methodology for using the tools. The case studies
were led by industrial partners of the Rodin project supported by the other partners. The case
studies were as follows:
a failure management system for an engine controller
part of a platform for mobile Internet technology
engineering of communications protocols
an air-traffic display system
an ambient campus application

References
Jean-Raymond Abrial. The B-Book: Assigning Programs to Meanings. Cambridge University Press, 1996,.
Jean-Raymond Abrial, Michael Butler, Stefan Hallerstede, and Laurent Voisin. An open extensible tool environment for Event-B. In Z. Liu and J. He, editors, ICFEM 2006, volume 4260, pages 588–605. Springer, 2006.
RODIN. Deliverable D18: Intermediate report on case study developments.
Michael Butler and Stefan Hallerstede :The Rodin Formal Modelling Tool,EU research project IST 511599 RODIN

Formal methods tools
Formal specification languages